Waterloo Bridge is a series of 41 impressionist oil paintings of the 1807–1810 Waterloo Bridge in London by Claude Monet, produced between 1900 and 1904 and forming a sub-series within his larger 'London series' alongside the Charing Cross Bridge series and the Houses of Parliament series.

Context
Under exile during the Franco-Prussian War, Monet travelled to London for the first time in 1870. Monet became enthralled with the city, and vowed to return to it someday. His fascination with London lay primarily in its fogs, a byproduct of the Industrial Revolution. But writers hypothesize that Monet was also inspired by contemporaries J. M. W. Turner and James Abbott McNeill Whistler, who were similarly fascinated by London's atmosphere and atmospheric effects. In 1899 Monet returned to London and rented a room in the Savoy Hotel, which offered an extensive viewpoint from which to begin his series of the city.

Between 1899 and 1905, Monet periodically travelled to London to work on paintings. He repeatedly painted the Waterloo Bridge and created other paintings of the city's sights, including the Houses of Parliament series and Charing Cross Bridge series. While Monet began all of the paintings in London, he completed many of them in his studio in Giverny.

Selected works

References

1903 paintings
Paintings of London by Claude Monet
Paintings in the collection of the Hermitage Museum
Collections of the National Gallery of Art
Collections of the National Gallery of Canada
Series of paintings by Claude Monet
Paintings in Copenhagen
Bridges in art
Water in art